Jean Françaix's Clarinet Concerto was composed in 1967–68.

Françaix dedicated the concerto to conductor Fernand Oubradous.  It premiered on July 20, 1968, and the clarinet soloist was Jacques Lancelot.

Compositions by Jean Françaix
1968 compositions
Francaix, Jean